Hannen is a surname. Notable people with the surname include:

Hermione Hannen, British actress
Isobel Hannen (née Torrance Jr.) (born 1962), Scottish curler and coach
James Hannen (Baron Hannen), British judge
 Sir Nicholas John Hannen, British barrister, judge and diplomat
Nicholas "Beau" Hannen, British actor
Athene Seyler, married to Nicholas "Beau" Hannen, also went by the name Athene Hannen in her personal life